Meskinabad-e Olya (also Romanized as Meskīnābād-e ‘Olyā) is a village in Badr Rural District, in the Central District of Ravansar County, Kermanshah Province, Iran. At the 2006 census, its population was 104, in 22 families.

References 

Populated places in Ravansar County